Vasilliki Babaletakis "Kiki" Divaris (c. 13 September 1925 in Sparta – 5 December 2015) was a Greek fashion designer, model and the first white woman to have been declared a liberation war hero in Zimbabwe.

Early life
Divaris grew up in Cape Town.

Career
Divaris was a close friend of Robert Mugabe, his first wife Sally, and current wife, Grace. She created the Miss Zimbabwe beauty pageant. In 2012, at 88, she still ran the event. In 2013, she handed over the Miss Zim business to Mary Mubaiwa.

Death
Divaris died in her sleep on 5 December 2015, at the Borrowdale Clinic Trauma Centre, Harare, Zimbabwe, from pneumonia.  She was 90.

References

1925 births
2015 deaths
People from Harare
Greek fashion designers
Zimbabwean people of Greek descent
Year of birth uncertain
Deaths from pneumonia in Zimbabwe
People from Cape Town